Erectile dysfunction (ED), also called impotence, is the type of sexual dysfunction in which the penis fails to become or stay erect during sexual activity. It is the most common sexual problem in men. Through its connection to self-image and to problems in sexual relationships, erectile dysfunction can cause psychological harm.

In about 80% of cases, physical causes can be identified. These include cardiovascular disease; diabetes mellitus; neurological problems, such as those following prostatectomy; hypogonadism; and drug side effects. About 10% of cases are psychological impotence, caused by thoughts or feelings; here, there is a strong response to placebo treatment.

The term erectile dysfunction is not used for other disorders of erection, such as priapism.

Treatment involves addressing the underlying causes, lifestyle modifications, and addressing psychosocial problems. In many cases, treatment is attempted by drugs, specifically PDE5 inhibitors (such as sildenafil), which dilate blood vessels, allowing more blood to flow through the spongy tissue of the penis (akin to opening a valve further in order to allow more water to enter a fire hose). Other treatments, less commonly used, include prostaglandin pellets, inserted in the urethra; smooth-muscle relaxants and vasodilators, injected into the penis; penile implants; penis pumps; and vascular reconstructive surgery.

Signs and symptoms
ED is characterized by the regular or repeated inability to achieve or maintain an erection of sufficient rigidity to accomplish sexual activity. It is defined as the "persistent or recurrent inability to achieve and maintain a penile erection of sufficient rigidity to permit satisfactory sexual activity for at least 3 months."

Psychological impact
ED often has an impact on the emotional well-being of both men and their partners. Many men do not seek treatment due to feelings of embarrassment. About 75% of diagnosed cases of ED go untreated.

Causes
Causes of or contributors to ED include the following:
 Diets high in saturated fat are linked to heart diseases, and men with heart diseases are more likely to experience ED. By contrast, plant-based diets show a lower risk for ED.
Prescription drugs (e.g., SSRIs, beta blockers, antihistamines, alpha-2 adrenergic receptor agonists, thiazides, hormone modulators, and 5α-reductase inhibitors)
 Neurogenic disorders (e.g., diabetic neuropathy, temporal lobe epilepsy, multiple sclerosis, Parkinson's disease, multiple system atrophy)
 Cavernosal disorders (e.g., Peyronie's disease)
 Hyperprolactinemia (e.g., due to a prolactinoma)
 Psychological causes: performance anxiety, stress, and mental disorders
 Surgery (e.g., radical prostatectomy)
 Ageing: after age 40 years, ageing itself is a risk factor for ED, although numerous other pathologies that may occur  with ageing, such as testosterone deficiency, cardiovascular diseases, or diabetes, among others, appear to have interacting effects
 Kidney disease: ED and chronic kidney disease have pathological mechanisms in common, including vascular and hormonal dysfunction, and may share other comorbidities, such as hypertension and diabetes mellitus that can contribute to ED
 Lifestyle habits, particularly smoking, which is a key risk factor for ED as it promotes arterial narrowing. Due to its propensity for causing detumescence and erectile dysfunction, some studies have described tobacco as an anaphrodisiacal substance.
COVID-19: preliminary research indicates that COVID-19 viral infection may affect sexual and reproductive health
Surgical intervention for a number of conditions may remove anatomical structures necessary to erection, damage nerves, or impair blood supply. ED is a common complication of treatments for prostate cancer, including prostatectomy and destruction of the prostate by external beam radiation, although the prostate gland itself is not necessary to achieve an erection. As far as inguinal hernia surgery is concerned, in most cases, and in the absence of postoperative complications, the operative repair can lead to a recovery of the sexual life of people with preoperative sexual dysfunction, while, in most cases, it does not affect people with a preoperative normal sexual life.

ED can also be associated with bicycling due to both neurological and vascular problems due to compression. The increased risk appears to be about 1.7-fold.

Concerns that use of pornography can cause ED have little support in epidemiological studies, according to a 2015 literature review. According to Gunter de Win, a Belgian professor and sex researcher, "Put simply, respondents who watch 60 minutes a week and think they're addicted were more likely to report sexual dysfunction than those who watch a care-free 160 minutes weekly."

In seemingly rare cases, medications such as SSRIs, isotretinoin (Accutane) and finasteride (Propecia) are reported to induce long-lasting iatrogenic disorders characterized by sexual dysfunction symptoms, including erectile dysfunction in males; these disorders are known as post-SSRI sexual dysfunction (PSSD), post-retinoid sexual dysfunction/post-Accutane syndrome (PRSD/PAS), and post-finasteride syndrome (PFS). These conditions remain poorly-understood and lack effective treatments, although they have been suggested to share a common etiology.

Pathophysiology
Penile erection is managed by two mechanisms: the reflex erection, which is achieved by directly touching the penile shaft, and the psychogenic erection, which is achieved by erotic or emotional stimuli. The former involves the peripheral nerves and the lower parts of the spinal cord, whereas the latter involves the limbic system of the brain. In both cases, an intact neural system is required for a successful and complete erection. Stimulation of the penile shaft by the nervous system leads to the secretion of nitric oxide (NO), which causes the relaxation of the smooth muscles of the corpora cavernosa (the main erectile tissue of the penis), and subsequently penile erection.  Additionally, adequate levels of testosterone (produced by the testes) and an intact pituitary gland are required for the development of a healthy erectile system. As can be understood from the mechanisms of a normal erection, impotence may develop due to hormonal deficiency, disorders of the neural system, lack of adequate penile blood supply or psychological problems. Spinal cord injury causes sexual dysfunction, including ED. Restriction of blood flow can arise from impaired endothelial function due to the usual causes associated with coronary artery disease, but can also be caused by prolonged exposure to bright light.

Diagnosis
In many cases, the diagnosis can be made based on the person's history of symptoms. In other cases, a physical examination and laboratory investigations are done to rule out more serious causes such as hypogonadism or prolactinoma.

One of the first steps is to distinguish between physiological and psychological ED. Determining whether involuntary erections are present is important in eliminating the possibility of psychogenic causes for ED. Obtaining full erections occasionally, such as nocturnal penile tumescence when asleep (that is, when the mind and psychological issues, if any, are less present), tends to suggest that the physical structures are functionally working. Similarly, performance with manual stimulation, as well as any performance anxiety or acute situational ED, may indicate a psychogenic component to ED.

Another factor leading to ED is diabetes mellitus, a well known cause of neuropathy). ED is also related to generally poor physical health, poor dietary habits, obesity, and most specifically cardiovascular disease, such as coronary artery disease and peripheral vascular disease.  Screening for cardiovascular risk factors, such as smoking, dyslipidemia, hypertension, and alcoholism, is helpful.

In some cases, the simple search for a previously undetected groin hernia can prove useful since it can affect sexual functions in men and is relatively easily curable.

The current diagnostic and statistical manual of mental diseases (DSM-IV) lists ED.

Ultrasonography

Penile ultrasonography with doppler can be used to examine the erect penis. Most cases of ED of organic causes are related to changes in blood flow in the corpora cavernosa, represented by occlusive artery disease (in which less blood is allowed to enter the penis), most often of atherosclerotic origin, or due to failure of the veno-occlusive mechanism (in which too much blood circulates back out of the penis). Before the Doppler sonogram, the penis should be examined in B mode, in order to identify possible tumors, fibrotic plaques, calcifications, or hematomas, and to evaluate the appearance of the cavernous arteries, which can be tortuous or atheromatous.

Erection can be induced by injecting 10–20 µg of prostaglandin E1, with evaluations of the arterial flow every five minutes for 25–30 min (see image). The use of prostaglandin E1 is contraindicated in patients with predisposition to priapism (e.g., those with sickle cell anemia), anatomical deformity of the penis, or penile implants. Phentolamine (2 mg) is often added. Visual and tactile stimulation produces better results. Some authors recommend the use of sildenafil by mouth to replace the injectable drugs in cases of contraindications, although the efficacy of such medication is controversial.

Before the injection of the chosen drug, the flow pattern is monophasic, with low systolic velocities and an absence of diastolic flow. After injection, systolic and diastolic peak velocities should increase, decreasing progressively with vein occlusion and becoming negative when the penis becomes rigid (see image below). The reference values vary across studies, ranging from > 25 cm/s to > 35 cm/s. Values above 35 cm/s indicate the absence of arterial disease, values below 25 cm/s indicate arterial insufficiency, and values of 25–35 cm/s are indeterminate because they are less specific (see image below). The data obtained should be correlated with the degree of erection observed. If the peak systolic velocities are normal, the final diastolic velocities should be evaluated, those above 5 cm/s being associated with venogenic ED.

Other workup methods
Penile nerves functionTests such as the bulbocavernosus reflex test are used to ascertain whether there is enough nerve sensation in the penis. The physician squeezes the glans (head) of the penis, which immediately causes the anus to contract if nerve function is normal. A physician measures the latency between squeeze and contraction by observing the anal sphincter or by feeling it with a gloved finger in the anus.

Nocturnal penile tumescence (NPT)It is normal for a man to have five to six erections during sleep, especially during rapid eye movement (REM). Their absence may indicate a problem with nerve function or blood supply in the penis. There are two methods for measuring changes in penile rigidity and circumference during nocturnal erection: snap gauge and strain gauge. A significant proportion of men who have no sexual dysfunction nonetheless do not have regular nocturnal erections.

Penile biothesiometryThis test uses electromagnetic vibration to evaluate sensitivity and nerve function in the glans and shaft of the penis.

Dynamic infusion cavernosometry (DICC)Technique in which fluid is pumped into the penis at a known rate and pressure. It gives a measurement of the vascular pressure in the corpus cavernosum during an erection.

Corpus cavernosometryCavernosography measurement of the vascular pressure in the corpus cavernosum.  Saline is infused under pressure into the corpus cavernosum with a butterfly needle, and the flow rate needed to maintain an erection indicates the degree of venous leakage. The leaking veins responsible may be visualized by infusing a mixture of saline and x-ray contrast medium and performing a cavernosogram. In Digital Subtraction Angiography (DSA), the images are acquired digitally.

Magnetic resonance angiography (MRA) This is similar to magnetic resonance imaging. Magnetic resonance angiography uses magnetic fields and radio waves to provide detailed images of the blood vessels. The doctor may inject into the patient's bloodstream a contrast agent, which causes vascular tissues to stand out against other tissues, so that information about blood supply and vascular anomalies is easier to gather.

Treatment

Treatment depends on the underlying cause. In general, exercise, particularly of the aerobic type, is effective for preventing ED during midlife. Counseling can be used if the underlying cause is psychological, including how to lower stress or anxiety related to sex. Medications by mouth and vacuum erection devices are first-line treatments, followed by injections of drugs into the penis, as well as penile implants. Vascular reconstructive surgeries are beneficial in certain groups. Treatments, other than surgery, do not fix the underlying physiological problem, but are used as needed before sex.

Medications
The PDE5 inhibitors sildenafil (Viagra), vardenafil (Levitra) and tadalafil (Cialis) are prescription drugs which are taken by mouth. As of 2018, sildenafil is available in the UK without a prescription.  Additionally, a cream combining alprostadil with the permeation enhancer DDAIP has been approved in Canada as a first line treatment for ED. Penile injections, on the other hand, can involve one of the following medications: papaverine, phentolamine, and prostaglandin E1, also known as alprostadil. In addition to injections, there is an alprostadil suppository that can be inserted into the urethra. Once inserted, an erection can begin within 10 minutes and last up to an hour. Medications to treat ED may cause a side effect called priapism.

Prevalence of medical diagnosis
In a study published in 2016, based on US health insurance claims data, out of 19,833,939 US males aged ≥18 years, only 1,108,842 (5.6%), were medically diagnosed with erectile dysfunction or on a PDE5I prescription (μ age 55.2 years, σ 11.2 years). Prevalence of diagnosis or prescription was the highest for age group 60–69 at 11.5%, lowest for age group 18–29 at 0.4%, and 2.1% for 30–39, 5.7% for 40–49, 10% for 50–59, 11% for 70–79, 4.6% for 80–89, 0.9% for ≥90, respectively.

Focused shockwave therapy
Focused shockwave therapy involves passing short, high frequency acoustic pulses through the skin and into the penis. These waves break down any plaques within the blood vessels, encourage the formation of new vessels, and stimulate repair and tissue regeneration.

Focused shockwave therapy appears to work best for men with vasculogenic ED, which is a blood vessel disorder that affects blood flow to tissue in the penis. The treatment is painless and has no known side effects. Treatment with shockwave therapy can lead to a significant improvement of the IIEF (International Index of Erectile Function).

Testosterone 

Men with low levels of testosterone can experience ED. Taking testosterone may help maintain an erection. Men with type 2 diabetes are twice as likely to have lower levels of testosterone, and are three times more likely to experience ED than non-diabetic men.

Pumps

A vacuum erection device helps draw blood into the penis by applying negative pressure. This type of device is sometimes referred to as penis pump and may be used just prior to sexual intercourse. Several types of FDA approved vacuum therapy devices are available under prescription.  When pharmacological methods fail, a purpose-designed external vacuum pump can be used to attain erection, with a separate compression ring fitted to the base of the penis to maintain it. These pumps should be distinguished from other penis pumps (supplied without compression rings) which, rather than being used for temporary treatment of impotence, are claimed to increase penis length if used frequently, or vibrate as an aid to masturbation. More drastically, inflatable or rigid penile implants may be fitted surgically.

Surgery

Often, as a last resort, if other treatments have failed, the most common procedure is prosthetic implants which involves the insertion of artificial rods into the penis. Some sources show that vascular reconstructive surgeries are viable options for some people.

Alternative medicine
The Food and Drug Administration (FDA) does not recommend alternative therapies to treat sexual dysfunction. Many products are advertised as "herbal viagra" or "natural" sexual enhancement products, but no clinical trials or scientific studies support the effectiveness of these products for the treatment of ED, and synthetic chemical compounds similar to sildenafil have been found as adulterants in many of these products. The FDA has warned consumers that any sexual enhancement product that claims to work as well as prescription products is likely to contain such a contaminant. A 2021 review indicated that ginseng had "only trivial effects on erectile function or satisfaction with intercourse compared to placebo".

History

Attempts to treat ED date back well over 1,000 years.  In the 8th century, men of Ancient Rome and Greece wore talismans of rooster and goat genitalia, believing these talismans would serve as an aphrodisiac and promote sexual function.  In the 13th century Albertus Magnus recommended ingesting roasted wolf penis as a remedy for impotence.

During the late 16th and 17th centuries in France, male impotence was considered a crime, as well as legal grounds for a divorce. The practice, which involved inspection of the complainants by court experts, was declared obscene in 1677.

The first successful vacuum erection device, or penis pump, was developed by Vincent Marie Mondat in the early 1800s.  A more advanced device, based on a bicycle pump, was developed by Geddings Osbon, a Pentecostal preacher, in the 1970s.  In 1982, he received FDA approval to market the product as the ErecAid®.

John R. Brinkley initiated a boom in male impotence cures in the U.S. in the 1920s and 1930s. His radio programs recommended expensive goat gland implants and "mercurochrome" injections as the path to restored male virility, including operations by surgeon Serge Voronoff.

Modern drug therapy for ED made a significant advance in 1983, when British physiologist Giles Brindley dropped his trousers and demonstrated to a shocked Urodynamics Society audience his papaverine-induced erection. The drug Brindley injected into his penis was a non-specific vasodilator, an alpha-blocking agent, and the mechanism of action was clearly corporal smooth muscle relaxation. The effect that Brindley discovered established the fundamentals for the later development of specific, safe, and orally effective drug therapies.

The current first-line treatment for ED, the oral PDE5 inhibitor, was introduced by Pfizer in 1999.

Anthropology
Anthropological research presents ED not as a disorder but, as a normal, and sometimes even welcome sign of healthy aging. Wentzell's study of 250 Mexican men in their 50s and 60s found that "most simply did not see decreasing erectile function as a biological pathology". The men interviewed described the decrease in erectile function "as an aid for aging in socially appropriate ways". A common theme amongst the interviewees showed that respectable older men shifted their focus toward the domestic sphere into a "second stage of life".  The Mexican men of this generation often pursued sex outside of marriage; decreasing erectile function acted as an aid to overcoming infidelity thus helping to attain the ideal "second stage" of life. A 56-year-old about to retire from the public health service said he would now "dedicate myself to my wife, the house, gardening, caring for the grandchildren—the Mexican classic". Wentzell found that treating ED as a pathology was antithetical to the social view these men held of themselves, and their purpose at this stage of their lives.
 
In the 20th and 21st centuries, anthropologists investigated how common treatments for ED are built upon assumptions of institutionalized social norms. In offering a range of clinical treatments to ‘correct’ a person's ability to produce an erection, biomedical institutions encourage the public to strive for prolonged sexual function. Anthropologists argue that a biomedical focus places emphasis on the biological processes of fixing the body thereby disregarding holistic ideals of health and aging. By relying on a wholly medical approach, Western biomedicine can become blindsided by bodily dysfunctions which can be understood as appropriate functions of age, and not as a medical problem. Anthropologists understand that a biosocial approach to ED considers a person's decision to undergo clinical treatment more likely a result of "society, political economy, history, and culture" than a matter of personal choice. In rejecting biomedical treatment for ED, men can challenge common forms of medicalized social control by deviating from what is considered the normal approach to dysfunction.

Lexicology
The Latin term impotentia coeundi describes simple inability to insert the penis into the vagina; it is now mostly replaced by more precise terms, such as erectile dysfunction (ED). The study of ED within medicine is covered by andrology, a sub-field within urology. Research indicates that ED is common, and it is suggested that approximately 40% of males experience symptoms compatible with ED, at least occasionally. The condition is also on occasion called phallic impotence. Its antonym, or opposite condition, is priapism.

References

Further reading

External links 

 

Non-sexuality
Penis disorders
Sexual dysfunctions
Penile erection
Men's health